Oliver Hill may refer to:

Oliver Hill (architect) (1887–1968), British architect
Oliver Hill (attorney) (1907–2007), American attorney
Oliver Hill (baseball) (1909–1970), American baseball player

See also
Oliver Hill (Peak District), a hill in Staffordshire, England